Spiralophantes is a monotypic genus of Asian sheet weavers containing the single species, Spiralophantes mirabilis. It was first described by A. V. Tanasevitch & Michael I. Saaristo in 2006, and has only been found in Nepal.

See also
 List of Linyphiidae species (Q–Z)

References

Linyphiidae
Monotypic Araneomorphae genera
Spiders of Asia